RTP Unia Racibórz was a women's football club from Racibórz, Poland. The club won five national championships, three Polish Cups and participated in the UEFA Women's Champions League.

History

As part of a sports club
Unia Racibórz was founded on 27 April 1946 as a men's team. Its initial name was Klub Sportowy Plania Racibórz. The club has undergone several name changes. From June 1949 to November 1949 it was named ZKS Chemik Racibórz, then it was called ZKS Unia Racibórz (until 18 March 1957), and KS Unia Racibórz up to the 1997–98 season before adopting the current name RTP Unia Racibórz. Until 2001, the year the women started training, the club had only a men's football team. The women's team was registered for league play in the 2002–03 season.

In January 2008, after discrepancies over the use of finances, the men's section split from RTP Unia and took the name KP Unia Racibórz. Thus RTP Unia Racibórz became exclusively a women's football club.

As an independent club
In 2006-07 the club gained promotion into Ekstraliga, Poland's first league for women. In their first season in the Ekstraliga the took 3rd place, but only one year later the team won the championship and ended the dominance of KS AZS Wrocław, who had won the title the last eight times. Unia was able to defend the title in 2009–10.

In the 2009-10 Champions League, the started in the round of 32 but lost to SV Neulengbach. Later that season Unia won their first national cup after beating Pogoń Women Szczecin7-1 in the final. The following season, Unia again lost the round of 32 champions league legs, this time to Brøndby. In 2012–13, Unia lost to VfL Wolfsburg and was eliminated by Konak Belediyespor a year later, at the round of 32 stage yet again.

After the 2012/13 season the main sponsor left and many players left for new clubs. Several of those were Polish national team players. Unia eventually withdrew from the Extraleague after the first half of the 2013/14 season because of financial problems. They stood at second place that time of being withdrawn. The club was disbanded and thus did not join lower-tier competitions.

Titles 
 5 Polish championships: 2009, 2010, 2011, 2012, 2013
 3 Polish cup-winner: 2010, 2011, 2012
 3 Polish indoor championships: 2008, 2009, 2011

UEFA competitions record

Current squad
As of 11 August 2012, according to UEFA's website.

Former internationals
  Leonarda Balog
  Iva Landeka

References

External links 
 Official Website
 Club at UEFA.com

 
1946 establishments in Poland
Association football clubs established in 1946
2001 establishments in Poland
Association football clubs established in 2001
Football clubs in Silesian Voivodeship
Racibórz County
Women's football clubs in Poland